Sinikka Bohlin (born 1947), is a Swedish social democratic politician who has been a member of the Riksdag in 1988–2010. She served as President of the Nordic Council in 2009.

Bohlin was born in Finland to a Finnish father and a Karelian-Belarusian mother, and moved to Sweden in 1968.

References

External links
 
 
 

1947 births
Living people
Members of the Riksdag from the Social Democrats
Women members of the Riksdag
Members of the Riksdag 1998–2002
Members of the Riksdag 2002–2006
Members of the Riksdag 2006–2010
Swedish people of Belarusian descent
Swedish people of Finnish descent
20th-century Swedish women politicians
20th-century Swedish politicians
21st-century Swedish women politicians
Swedish people of Karelian descent